Edward Harding "Ed" MacBurney SSC (October 30, 1927 – March 17, 2022) was an American Anglican bishop. He was born in Albany, New York to Alfred Cadwell MacBurney (1896-1986) and Florence Marion McDowell MacBurney (1897-1989). A graduate of Dartmouth College (BA 1949), Berkeley Divinity School (STB 1952), and St Stephen's House, Oxford, he was ordained to the priesthood in December 1952 by the Church of England Bishop of Ely Edward Wynn. He served in the Episcopal Diocese of New Hampshire at Trinity Episcopal Church, Hanover, from 1953 to 1973 before appointment as dean of Trinity Episcopal Cathedral in Davenport, Iowa from 1973 to 1987. MacBurney served from 1988 to 1994 as the seventh bishop of the Episcopal Diocese of Quincy. During the consents process following MacBurney's election, Bishop John Shelby Spong of the Episcopal Diocese of Newark "urged his fellow liberal bishops to encourage their diocesan standing committees to confirm Dean MacBurney's election for the sake of the catholicity of the Church."

He was consecrated at the former Cathedral Church of St. Paul in Peoria, Illinois on January 16, 1988, by Presiding Bishop Edmond L. Browning with Bishop William L. Stevens of the Episcopal Diocese of Fond du Lac and Bishop George E. Bates of the Episcopal Diocese of Utah.

In 1991, MacBurney refused to discipline Peoria cathedral dean John Backus during his criminal proceedings and conviction for child pornography possession. Backus claimed at his 1991 arrest following a maid's discovery in his bedroom of videos and photographs of children engaged in sex acts that the material had been given to him by other priests in Montana and Washington struggling with child pornography addiction. Backus declined to name them, citing the seal of the confessional. After the dean's conviction, MacBurney transferred him to the Episcopal Diocese of New York, where The New York Times covered the matter three times in 2002.

On April 2, 2008, MacBurney was inhibited from ministry by the Presiding Bishop of the Episcopal Church, Katharine Jefferts Schori, over charges of celebrating confirmations in an Episcopal diocese without permission of the local bishop. On September 9, 2008, the Presiding Bishop removed Bishop MacBurney's inhibition after he apologized for accepting an invitation from Anglican Province of the Southern Cone Archbishop Gregory Venables to conduct confirmations in California. In June 2009, it was announced that Jefferts Schori had accepted MacBurney's renunciations of his vows to the Episcopal Church; he later transferred as a retired bishop to the Anglican Church in North America (ACNA). In the ACNA, Bishop MacBurney served as Assistant Bishop of Fort Worth in the consecrations of Bishop William Ilgenfritz in 2009 and suffragan James Randall Hiles in 2013.

In 1991, he was appointed a trustee of Nashotah House Theological Seminary, which had awarded him an honorary Doctorate of Divinity in 1988. Bishop MacBurney was a trustee of Berkeley Divinity School from 1964 to 1970, of St. Luke's Hospital, Davenport from 1973 to 1987; of the National Organization Episcopalians for Life from 1991 until his death, and vice president of the former Episcopal Synod of America from 1988 until its 1999 transition into Forward in Faith North America.

Personal life
On February 20, 1965, he married Anne Farnsworth Grubb, and adopted her three sons. She predeceased him on February 29, 2016, in Bettendorf, Iowa.

See also
 Anglican realignment
 Diocese of Quincy (ACNA)
 Episcopal Diocese of Quincy
 Forward in Faith

References
Episcopal Clerical Directory

External links
History page at the Diocese of Quincy website [archived]
The Rev. Edward H. MacBurney '49 Dartmouth Alumni Magazine
U.S. Traditionalists Join Forward in Faith Movement, Episcopal News Service, June 30, 1999
"2 Who Queried Pastor's Past Are Forced Off Parish Board," The New York Times, July 16, 2002
"Priest Is Pressed for Names in Pornography Case," The New York Times, July 19, 2002
"Bishop Alerts 3 Dioceses to Pornography Case," The New York Times, August 2, 2002
Inhibition of bishop temporarily lifted, Episcopal News Service, April 14, 2008
Presiding Bishop removes MacBurney's inhibition after retired bishop apologizes, Episcopal News Service, September 10, 2008
Presiding Bishop Jefferts Schori accepts renunciations of Bane and MacBurney Episcopal Church Office of Public Affairs, June 12, 2009
PECUSA v. the Rt. Rev. Edward H. MacBurney, Archives of the Episcopal Church Digital Archive of Trial Cases, Accords and Orders in Matters of Ecclesiastical Discipline, last update February 2021

1927 births
2022 deaths
Bishops of the Anglican Church in North America
American Episcopal priests
People from Peoria, Illinois
Christians from Illinois
Episcopal bishops of Quincy
Dartmouth College alumni
Religious leaders from Albany, New York
Anglo-Catholic clergy
American Anglo-Catholics
Anglican realignment people